Osieczna Castle - built between 1890 and 1908, a Renaissance Revival castle located in Osieczna, Greater Poland Voivodeship in Poland.

References

Castles in Greater Poland Voivodeship
Leszno County